Platina is a municipality (município) in the state of São Paulo in Brazil. As of 2020 the population is estimated to be 3,578 inside an area of 326.73 km². The elevation of the municipality is 466 meters.

References

Municipalities in São Paulo (state)